The Philippine–American War was an armed military conflict between the United States and the First Philippine Republic, fought from 1899 to at least 1902, which arose from a Filipino political struggle against U.S. occupation of the Philippines. While the conflict was officially declared over on July 4, 1902, American troops continued hostilities against remnants of the Philippine Army and other resistance groups until 1913, and some historians consider these unofficial extensions part of the war.

The Medal of Honor was created during the American Civil War and is the highest military decoration presented by the United States government to a member of its armed forces. The recipient must have distinguished themselves at the risk of their own life above and beyond the call of duty in action against an enemy of the United States. Due to the nature of this medal, it is commonly presented posthumously.

Eighty-one men were awarded the Medal of Honor for their actions in the Philippine–American War: 70 from the Army, 5 from the Navy, and 6 from the Marine Corps. Four of the awards were posthumous. Among the recipients were Webb Hayes, the son of former U.S. President Rutherford B. Hayes, and two prominent Marine Corps officers, Hiram I. Bearss and David Dixon Porter. Bearss became known for leading long-range reconnaissance patrols behind enemy lines and was later wounded as a colonel in World War I. Porter was from a distinguished military family and rose to become a major general. José B. Nísperos, a member of the Philippine Scouts who was honored for continuing to fight after being wounded, was the first Asian recipient of the Medal of Honor.

Recipients

Note: Notes in quotations are derived or are copied in their entirety from the actual Medal of Honor citation

References

General
 
 
 
 

Inline

Philippine